Kandhamal Lok Sabha constituency is one of the 21 Lok Sabha constituencies in Odisha state in eastern India. This constituency came into existence in 2008, following the implementation of delimitation of parliamentary constituencies based on the recommendations of the Delimitation Commission of India constituted in 2002.

Assembly segments
Kandhamal Lok Sabha constituency comprises 7 legislative assembly segments, which are:

Baliguda, G. Udayagiri, Phulbani, Boudh and Bhanjanagar assembly segments were earlier in Phulbani constituency

Members of Parliament
2009: Rudramadhab Ray, BJD  
2014: Hemendra Chandra Singh, BJD
2014: Pratyusha Rajeshwari Singh, BJD
2019: Achyutananda Samanta, BJD

Election Result

2019 Election Result

2014 Bye-Election Result
In 2014 bye-election, Biju Janata Dal candidate Pratyusha Rajeshwari Singh defeated Bharatiya Janata Party candidate Rudramadhab Ray by a margin of 2,98,868 votes.  
Bye-election to the Kandhmal lok sabha constituency was held on 15 October 2014.
Seven candidates had contested the election.

2014 Election Result
In 2014 election, Biju Janata Dal candidate Hemendra Chandra Singh defeated Indian National Congress candidate Harihar Karan by a margin of 1,81,017 votes.

General Election 2009

References

External links
Kandhamal lok sabha  constituency election 2019 date and schedule

Lok Sabha constituencies in Odisha
Kandhamal district
Boudh district
Nayagarh district
Politics of Ganjam district